Louis Albert Meldon (10 October 1886 – 21 February 1956) was an Irish sportsman, who represented his country in both cricket and tennis.

A right-handed batsman and right-arm medium pace bowler, Meldon played four first-class cricket matches for Ireland, all against Scotland, between 1909 and 1912.

He also appeared in five Davis Cup ties for the Irish team and made the third round of the 1925 Wimbledon Championships.

References

CricketEurope Stats Zone profile
Davis Cup record

1886 births
1956 deaths
Irish cricketers
Irish male tennis players
Tennis players from Dublin (city)
Cricketers from Dublin (city)